Boo Kim Siang (born 21 January 1938) is a Malaysian weightlifter. He competed in the men's lightweight event at the 1964 Summer Olympics.

References

1938 births
Living people
Malaysian male weightlifters
Olympic weightlifters of Malaysia
Weightlifters at the 1964 Summer Olympics
Place of birth missing (living people)
20th-century Malaysian people